Ozerny (Nuurta) is a rural locality (a settlement) in Yeravninsky District, Republic of Buryatia, Russia. The population was 427 as of 2010. There are 7 streets.

Geography 
Ozerny is located 57 km north of Sosnovo-Ozerskoye (the district's administrative centre) by road. Khorga is the nearest rural locality.

References 

Rural localities in Yeravninsky District